NGC 431 is a lenticular galaxy of type SB0 located in the constellation Andromeda. It was discovered on November 22, 1827 by John Herschel. It was described by Dreyer as "faint, small, very suddenly brighter middle."

References

External links
 

0431
18271122
Andromeda (constellation)
Lenticular galaxies
004437
000776